During the 1987–88 English football season, Aston Villa competed in the Football League Second Division and won promotion back to the top flight under manager, Graham Taylor, at their first attempt.

Diary of the season
3 Jul 1987 – Chelsea sign defender Tony Dorigo from Aston Villa for £475,000.

31 Aug 1987 – Plymouth Argyle and Barnsley lead the way on goal difference, but fancied Aston Villa are fourth from bottom.

31 Oct 1987 – Aston Villa now stand fourth, with Ipswich Town and Birmingham City close behind.

19 Nov 1987 – Aston Villa boost their Second Division promotion quest with a £150,000 move for Crystal Palace midfielder Andy Gray.

30 Nov 1987 – Middlesbrough and Bradford City are level at the top of the Second Division on 43 points. Aston Villa, Hull City and Crystal Palace occupy the play-off places.

31 Dec 1987 – Graeme Souness signs Aston Villa midfielder Mark Walters for Rangers for £550,000. Middlesbrough lead with a one-point margin over Bradford City. A four-point margin separates their nearest six challengers – Aston Villa, Crystal Palace, Millwall, Hull City, Manchester City and Ipswich Town.

11 Jan 1988 – Dave Bassett is sacked after just six months in charge of Watford, who are currently bottom of the First Division. He is succeeded by Aston Villa assistant manager Steve Harrison.

26 Jan 1988 – Aston Villa boost their Second Division promotion challenge with the £200,000 acquisition of highly rated Crewe Alexandra midfielder David Platt, 21.

31 Jan 1988 – Aston Villa have crept to the top of the Second Division, while Crystal Palace have risen to second place. Middlesbrough, Millwall and Blackburn Rovers occupy the play-off zone, while Bradford City have slid from second to sixth place in the space of a few weeks. Leicester City, relegated from the First Division last season, are now in the Second Division relegation play-off places.

29 Feb 1988 – The Second Division promotion race sees Aston Villa and Blackburn Rovers level at the top of the table, with Millwall, Middlesbrough and Bradford City occupying the play-off places.

31 Mar 1988 – Aston Villa remain top of the Second Division with a two-point margin over Blackburn Rovers, with the play-off places being occupied by Middlesbrough, Millwall and Bradford City. Leeds United, Crystal Palace and Stoke City remain in strong contention for promotion as well.

30 Apr 1988 – The promotion issues in the Second Division have yet to be confirmed, with just four points separating the top five clubs – Millwall, Aston Villa, Bradford City, Middlesbrough and Blackburn Rovers.

26 May 1988 – Aston Villa prepare for their First Division comeback by signing Derek Mountfield from Everton for £425,000 and Chris Price from Blackburn Rovers for £150,000.

League table

References

Aston Villa F.C. seasons
Aston Villa